John McAndrew (4 November 1889 – 10 April 1961) was an Australian cricketer. He played in eleven first-class matches for Queensland between 1914 and 1925. He served as chief groundsman of the Brisbane Cricket Ground in the 1950s.

See also
 List of Queensland first-class cricketers

References

External links
 

1889 births
1961 deaths
Australian cricketers
Queensland cricketers
Cricketers from New South Wales